Coolamon may refer to:

 Coolamon (vessel) - an Indigenous Australian container
Coolamon, New South Wales - an Australian town
Coolamon Shire - an Australian local government area
Syzygium moorei - an Australian rainforest tree